Henri Chopin (18 June 1922 – 3 January 2008) was a French avant-garde poet and musician.

Life
Henri Chopin was born in Paris, 18 June 1922, one of three brothers, and the son of an accountant. Both his siblings died during the war. One was shot by a German soldier the day after an armistice was declared in Paris, the other while sabotaging a train.

Chopin was a French practitioner of concrete and sound poetry, well known throughout the second half of the 20th century. His work, though iconoclastic, remained well within the historical spectrum of poetry as it moved from a spoken tradition to the printed word and now back to the spoken word again. He created a large body of pioneering recordings using early tape recorders, studio technologies and the sounds of the manipulated human voice. His emphasis on sound is a reminder that language stems as much from oral traditions as from classic literature, of the relationship of balance between order and chaos.

Chopin is significant above all for his diverse spread of creative achievement, as well as for his position as a focal point of contact for the international arts. As poet, painter, graphic artist and designer, typographer, independent publisher, filmmaker, broadcaster and arts promoter, Chopin's work is a barometer of the shifts in European media between the 1950s and the 1970s.

In 1966 he was with Gustav Metzger, Otto Muehl, Wolf Vostell, Peter Weibel and others a participant of the Destruction in Art Symposium (DIAS) in London.

In 1964 he created OU, one of the most notable reviews of the second half of the 20th century, and he ran it until 1974. OU'''s contributors included William S. Burroughs, Brion Gysin, Gil J. Wolman, François Dufrêne, Bernard Heidsieck, John Furnival, Tom Phillips, and the Austrian sculptor, writer and Dada pioneer Raoul Hausmann.

His books included Le Dernier Roman du Monde (1971), Portrait des 9 (1975), The Cosmographical Lobster (1976), Poésie Sonore Internationale (1979), Les Riches Heures de l'Alphabet (1992) and Graphpoemesmachine (2006). Henri also created many graphic works on his typewriter: the typewriter poems (also known as dactylopoèmes) feature in international art collections such as those of Francesco Conz in Verona, the Morra Foundation in Naples and Ruth and Marvin Sackner in Miami, and have been the subject of Australian, British and French retrospectives.

His publication and design of the classic audio-visual magazines Cinquième Saison and OU between 1958 and 1974, each issue containing recordings as well as texts, images, screenprints and multiples, brought together international contemporary writers and artists such as members of Lettrisme and Fluxus, Jiri Kolar, Ian Hamilton Finlay, Tom Phillips, Brion Gysin, William S. Burroughs and many others, as well as bringing the work of survivors from earlier generations such as Raoul Hausmann and Marcel Janco to a fresh audience.

From 1968 to 1986 Henri Chopin lived in Ingatestone, Essex, but with the death of his wife Jean in 1985, he moved back to France.

In 2001 with his health failing, he returned to England, living with his daughter and family at Dereham, Norfolk until his death on 3 January 2008.

Aesthetics
Chopin's poesie sonore aesthetics included a deliberate cultivation of a barbarian approach in production, using raw or crude sound manipulations to explore the area between
distortion and intelligibility. He avoided high-quality, professional recording machines, preferring to use very basic equipment and bricolage methods, such as sticking matchsticks in the erase heads of a second-hand tape recorder, or manually interfering with the tape path.

 Books 
Chopin, Henri. 1979. Poesie Sonore Internationale, edited by Jean-Michel Place. Paris: Trajectoires.
 Films on Henri Chopin De Henri à Chopin, le dernier pape by Frédéric Acquaviva and Maria Faustino, DV, 3h10mn, 2002–2008Henri Chopin, reflecting on OU, by Silva Gabriela Béju, DV, 28', 2001, published in 2016 in "CRU"n°2  magazine (La Plaque Tournante, Berlin, dir. Frédéric Acquaviva and Loré Lixenberg)

 References 

Further reading
Patterson, Jack. 2022. "Henri Chopin: From the Paper Civilization to the Electronic Age". Resonance 3, n. 4 (December): 344–363. doi: https://doi.org/10.1525/res.2022.3.4.344
Jamet, Cédric. 2009. "Limitless Voice(s), Intensive Bodies: Henri Chopin's Poetics of Expansion". Mosaic 42, n. 2 (June): 135–51.
Lentz, Michael. 1996. "'Musik? Poesie? Eigentlich …': Lautmusik/Poesie nach 1945". Neue Zeitschrift für Musik 157, n. 2 (March–April): 47–55.
Matter, Marc. 2014. "Revue OU Disque" (Editorial). Fabrikzeitung, n. 298 (February): 2–3.
Norris, Andrew. 2005. "Projections of the Pulseless Body: Don van Vliet and Henri Chopin". Chapter & Verse, n. 3 (Spring).
Oehlschlägel, Reinhard. 2008. "Henri Chopin gestorben". MusikTexte, n. 116 (February): 87.
Zurbrugg, Nicholas. 1994. 'Electronic Arts in Australia' Continuum Vol 8, No 1 (p129-132) Interview with Henri Chopin. 
Zurbrugg, Nicholas. 2001. "Programming Paradise: Haraldo de Campos, Concrete Poetry, and the Postmodern Multimedia Avant-Garde". In Writing Aloud: The Sonics of Language'', edited by Brandon LaBelle and Christof Migone, 7–35. Los Angeles: Errant Bodies. .

External links 
 Archivio Conz
 Sound and video on erratum.org
The History of ASCII (Text) Art by Joan G. Stark.
Henri Chopin Papers. General Collection, Beinecke Rare Book and Manuscript Library, Yale University.

Listening
UbuWeb Sound: Henri Chopin.

1922 births
2008 deaths
20th-century French poets
Sound poets
French composers
French expatriates in the Czech Republic
Writers from Paris
French male poets
20th-century French musicians
20th-century French male writers